Larry Brune (born May 4, 1953) is a former American football defensive back. He played for the Hamilton Tiger-Cats from 1976 to 1977, the Ottawa Rough Riders from 1977 to 1979 and from 1981 to 1982 and for the Minnesota Vikings in 1980.

References

1953 births
Living people
Players of American football from San Diego
American football defensive backs
Rice Owls football players
Hamilton Tiger-Cats players
Ottawa Rough Riders players
Minnesota Vikings players